Natalie Rona Miller  is an Australian film distributor, exhibitor and producer. She is known as the founder of film distribution house Sharmill Films, and the Melbourne theatres Longford Cinema and Cinema Nova.

Film industry career
Miller studied at Methodist Ladies' College, Melbourne, and then completed an arts degree at the University of Melbourne. She began her career working in journalism and public relations at the Australian Broadcasting Corporation, then entered the film industry working on public relations for the Melbourne Film Festival for 17 years. In the mid-1960s, she was so impressed by Luis Buñuel's surrealist film The Exterminating Angel, which had shown at the festival, that she purchased the Australian distribution rights herself and exhibited it at the Palais Theatre in Melbourne to give the film a wider audience. Following the success of her first foray into film exhibition, Miller founded Sharmill Films in 1967, which specialises in the distribution of arthouse films in Australia.

Miller also founded two cinemas in Melbourne: the Longford Cinema in South Yarra, which closed in 2005 after Village Cinemas opened a multiplex at The Jam Factory; and Cinema Nova, an arthouse cinema in Carlton (co-founded with Barry Peake) which began with two screens and has now expanded to 16.

Honours and awards
Medal of the Order of Australia (2001): For service to the Australian film industry, particularly the production, distribution and exhibition of quality film.
Chevalier dans L'Ordre des Arts et des Lettres (2003): For services to the promotion of French culture in Australia.
 In 2011, the Natalie Miller Fellowship was founded, which awards a $10,000 fellowship to women working in the film industry in Australia.
 Officer of the Order of Australia (2013): For distinguished service to the film industry through promotion of screen culture, as a mentor to emerging film-makers, particularly women, and contributions to advisory and professional organisations.
 Screen Producers Australia Lifetime Achievement Award (2015)
 Victorian Honour Roll of Women (2017)

References

External links
Sharmill Films
Natalie Miller Fellowship

Year of birth missing (living people)
Living people
Film distributors of Australia
Australian film producers
University of Melbourne alumni
University of Melbourne women
People educated at Methodist Ladies' College, Melbourne
Officers of the Order of Australia
Recipients of the Medal of the Order of Australia
Chevaliers of the Ordre des Arts et des Lettres